The Sydney University Handball Club is a handball team from the University of Sydney from Sydney, Australia. They are five times Men's National Champions, seven times Men's Oceania Champions and qualified for seven IHF Super Globe competitions. The men's team has won the State Championship eleven times. The women's team has also won the State Championship nine times.

Records

Men
 IHF Super Globe (World Club Championship)
Qualified - 2012, 2013, 2014, 2015, 2016, 2017, 2018, 2019, 2021 and 2022
Best Finish - 4th 2015

 Oceania Handball Champions Cup - 8 titles
Winners - 2011, 2013, 2014, 2015, 2016, 2017, 2018, 2019

 Australian Handball Club Championship - 7 titles
Winners - 2014, 2015, 2016, 2017, 2019

 Handball League Australia - 1 title
Winners - 2016
Runner-up- 2017

 Australian University Games
Bronze Medal - 2007

 New South Wales Handball League - 12 titles
Winners - 2018 (Season 1), 2017, 2016, 2015, 2014, 2012, 2009, 2008, 2003, 2002, 2001, 1998

Women
 New South Wales Handball League - 11 titles
Winners - 2016, 2015, 2014, 2013, 2011, 2010, 2009, 2007, 2005, 2004.

Mixed
 Australian University Games
Gold Medal - 2011, 2014
Silver Medal - 2012

References

External links
Official webpage
New South Wales Handball webpage
Sydney University Sport and Fitness website

Handball League Australia
Handball
Sporting clubs in Sydney
Australian handball clubs
University and college sports clubs in Australia
1995 establishments in Australia
Handball clubs established in 1995